Wolff & Müller is a construction company which operates internationally. The headquarters are at Schwieberdinger Straße, 107 Stuttgart, Germany.

Wolff & Müller is one of the top ten German construction companies. Building projects include the Mercedes-Benz Museum and the Porsche Arena in Stuttgart.

Wolff and Müller plans and builds highways, bridges, factories, power plants, office buildings, sports arenas and hotels. The company is involved in the production of asphalt and sand. Wolff and Müller has a division for managing commercial property.

Construction and civil engineering companies established in 1936
1936 establishments in Germany
Construction and civil engineering companies of Germany